Dasmariñas is a barangay in Makati, Metro Manila, Philippines. It occupies 1.9033 square kilometers or 190.33 hectares and is bounded by Epifanio de los Santos Avenue (EDSA) to the north, McKinley Road to the northeast, Pili Avenue/Forbes Park South to the east, Maricaban Creek to the south, and Ecology Village to the west. It is roughly coterminous with Dasmariñas Village, a gated private residential subdivision. According to the 2015 census, it is inhabited by 5,589 people. The village is managed by the Dasmariñas Village Association (DVA).

History 
Dasmariñas Village was developed by Ayala y Compañía in the early 1960s and was originally conceived as part of Forbes Park. It is believed to be the first housing development in the Philippines to include air conditioning as a standard feature in all its houses. DVA was incorporated in 1965, while Barangay Dasmariñas was split from Forbes Park and established in 1971.

Colegio San Agustin, a private co-educational school founded in 1969, is located within the premises of Dasmariñas Village, specifically on Palm Avenue. The school is attended by residents and non-residents of the village.

Controversies 
In 2003, the soldiers behind the so-called Oakwood mutiny were allegedly discovered to have concealed weapons inside a house in Dasmariñas.

In November 2013, the gated community's security service was involved in a widely reported incident in which Makati's then-mayor Junjun Binay was briefly prevented from exiting through a gate that had been closed for the night, and the guards who tried to enforce the closure were first apparently threatened by Binay's own security staff, then later briefly arrested by Makati police.
 
In April 2021, barangay officials created an unauthorized registration portal for the Makati COVID-19 vaccination program, causing confusion, as well as putting the lives of seniors at risk. Such action was strongly condemned by Makati Mayor Abigail Binay.

Amenities 
Dasmariñas Village contains two parks (Campanilla Park and Mahogany Park), a post office, an enclosed pavilion that is rented out for private functions, a gym, a basketball and badminton court, and a tennis court. In addition, Barangay Dasmariñas runs a medical clinic and a dental clinic for residents and their hired help.

Notable residents 
Dasmariñas Village contains a number of foreign embassies. The village also has houses belonging to prominent politicians, businesspeople and celebrities, as well as expatriate employees and diplomats working in the Philippines.

References 

 "Guide to Living in Dasma" (undated brochure)
 Dasmarinas Newsletter

External links
 Dasmariñas Village Association Official Website
 Barangay Dasmariñas at City of Makati official web portal

Gated communities in Metro Manila
Barangays of Metro Manila
Makati